Jazz Scene USA was an American television program of 26 30-minute episodes recorded in 1962, which featured performances by leading jazz musicians of the time.   It was produced by Jimmie Baker, directed by Steve Binder, and (except for the first episode) was presented by Oscar Brown Jr.

History
Jazz Scene USA was initiated by jazz fan and television personality Steve Allen, who had regularly introduced and promoted jazz performers on The Tonight Show.   Allen and his company, Meadowlane Productions, provided the financing for Jazz Scene USA.  An independent production, it was recorded at the CBS Television City studios in Hollywood.  Allen invited Jimmie Baker to produce the show.  Baker had previously produced the show Stars of Jazz, which had run between 1956 and 1958.  The shows were directed by Steve Binder, who had also worked on Stars of Jazz.

The first show was filmed on April 21, 1962, featured the Jazz Crusaders, and was hosted by KMLA radio DJ Vern Stevenson.  Subsequent shows were hosted by jazz singer Oscar Brown Jr..   In all, 26 shows were recorded.   The series was shown on selected TV stations, including KOGO-TV in San Diego, who started running the series in December 1962.   It was sold on a syndication basis to stations and CATV operators. Allen had hoped to produce a second series of 26 episodes, but these were never made because of a lack of funding.

Eight of the programs were subsequently issued on VHS and DVD.

Episodes

References

External links

  Interview with director Steve Binder, Television Academy

Jazz television series
1960s American music television series